Renee Spearman (born March 3, 1969 in Lynwood, CA)  is an American gospel, Christian, recording artist,  singer, songwriter and producer.  Her solo music career began in 2012 and has since released one album which charted at number 4 on the Billboard Gospel Album Chart, number 37 on the Billboard Independent Albums Chart and Billboard Top 200.

As a child, Spearman was involved heavily in the music department at her church where her father, Ernest Spearman, pastored.  Her mother, Maude "Doll" Spearman was very influential in her music life as well.

She has worked on a number of different albums with a variety of different artists including: Gladys Knight in At Last in 2001 and Yolanda Adams on The Experience in 2002.

In her own recordings she has worked with: Dr. Bobby Jones of BET, Byron Cage, Beverly Crawford, DJ Rogers and Paul Jackson Jr.

Spearman is a 2010 Stellar Award nominee and, in 2008, her album He Changed Me, reached number 13 on the Billboard Gospel Chart.

Renee's 2019 single "I Love Him", featuring Hezekiah Walker & Dr. Holly Carter, debuted on the Billboard Gospel Airplay Chart.

Discography
 1995 Change The World
 1997  From A Songwriter's Perspective 
 2002 Celebrate 2008 He Changed Me 2012 Whoa To Wow'' 
 2014 "Rejoice With Me!"
 2017 "Good Morning (You Made It!)
 2019 "I Love Him" featuring Hezekiah Walker & Dr. Holly Carter Gospel Airplay

References

External links

1969 births
Living people
American gospel singers
African-American women singer-songwriters
21st-century African-American women singers
20th-century African-American women singers